This is a list of newspapers in Barbados. Older issues of Barbadian newspapers can be found in the British Newspaper Archive repository.

Daily
The Barbados Advocate – Bridgetown
The Daily Nation – Bridgetown

Special
 Hansard – publication of the Parliamentary proceedings in Barbados prior to the Government Printing Office
 The Official Gazette of Barbados (Bridgetown) – publication of the Barbados Government Printing Office

News websites
Caribbean360 – Bridgetown
Caribbean Broadcasting Corporation – Bridgetown
Caribbean News Agency (CANA) – Bridgetown

Defunct
Barbadian
Barbados Agricultural Reporter
Barbados Gazette - Barbados' first newspaper, established 1731.
Barbados Globe & Colonial Advocate
Barbados Mercury
Barbados Recorder
Barbados Standard
Barbados Times
The Beacon
Bridgetown Gazette
Caribbean Week
The General Intelligence
The Investigator
The Penny Paper
Pepper Punch
Saturday Review
The Sentinel
The Small Report
Times
The Torch
Truth
Weekly Illustrated Paper
Weekly Recorder
The West India Magazine
West Indian

See also 
 List of newspapers
 Media in Barbados

References

Further reading 

Barbados
Newspapers
List